Elijah Erkloo is a former territorial level politician in Canada. He was a Member of the Northwest Territories Legislature from 1983 until 1987.

Political career
Erkloo was first elected to the Northwest Territories Legislature in the 1983 Northwest Territories general election. He served one term and did not return after the Legislature was dissolved in 1987.

In 2002, Erkloo sought to become President of the Qikiqtani Inuit Association. He ran against three other candidates finishing second to Thomasie Alikatuktuk.

Filmography
Erkloo appeared in the 1990 Canadian documentary Between Two Worlds.

References

Members of the Legislative Assembly of the Northwest Territories
Living people
People from Pond Inlet
Inuit from the Northwest Territories
Inuit politicians
Year of birth missing (living people)
Inuit from Nunavut